Benone Dohot (born 23 April 1963) is a Romanian former football goalkeeper. After he ended his playing career, Dohot worked as a goalkeeper coach.

Honours
Politehnica Iași
Divizia B: 1981–82
Foresta Fălticeni
Divizia B: 1996–97

Notes

References

1963 births
Living people
Romanian footballers
Association football goalkeepers
Liga I players
Liga II players
Nemzeti Bajnokság I players
Nemzeti Bajnokság II players
FC Politehnica Iași (1945) players
FC Dinamo București players
CSM Flacăra Moreni players
Diósgyőri VTK players
CSM Ceahlăul Piatra Neamț players
Romanian expatriate footballers
Expatriate footballers in Hungary
Expatriate sportspeople in Hungary
Romanian expatriates in Hungary
Romanian expatriate sportspeople in Hungary
Sportspeople from Iași